The following is a list of estuaries of Wales. Wales's many estuaries are generally named for the principal river which enters the sea through them. Those indicated thus * are listed at this reference.

 Afan estuary*
 Alaw estuary*
 Artro estuary*
 Cefni estuary*
 Conwy estuary
 Daugleddau estuary
 Dee estuary*
 Dwyryd estuary (known as Traeth Bach)
 Dyfi estuary*
 Dysynni estuary*
 Ebbw estuary
 Foryd Bay* (estuary of the Gwyrfai and Carrog rivers)
 Glaslyn estuary or Traeth Bach*
 Gwendraeth estuary
 Lavan Sands (not strictly an estuary but included in the NCC list of estuaries)
 Loughor estuary* (a.k.a. Burry Inlet)
 Mawddach estuary
 Neath estuary
 Nyfer (or Nevern) estuary*
 Ogmore estuary*
 Pwllheli Harbour* (estuary of the rivers Erch and Rhyd-hir)
 Rhymney estuary
 Severn Estuary*
 Taf estuary
 Tawe estuary
 Teifi estuary*
 Thaw estuary
 Traeth-coch
 Traeth Dulas
 Traeth melynog*
 Tywi estuary
 Usk estuary
 Wye estuary

References

Lists of landforms of Wales